U' pastizz 'rtunnar, commonly known as pastizz, is a baked turnover with a savoury filling, typical of the Italian Basilicata region.

Meaning
It is a Lucanian dialect noun, roughly translated in "The pastry of Rotondella", where the product originated from. It should not be confused with the Maltese pastizz.

History
It is a type of calzone, originated between the 18th and 19th century. By tradition, pastizz was prepared in particular events of the year (pig slaughter, Easter and the celebration of Saint Mary of Anglona), when the availability of meat was increased. The half-moon shape is linked to a symbolism that refers to the concepts of female fertility and prosperity and recalls that of a large womb that holds nutritious elements. Today it can be found at bakeries, restaurants, and pizzerias, although homemade tradition is still common.

Preparation

Pastizz is traditionally cooked in a wood-burning oven. Its dimension is 15-20 cm long and 10-12 cm wide. Fresh seasoned pork (or, more rarely, goat meat) is the main ingredient, in addition to egg and cheese, and seasoned with salt, diced parsley, pepper and extra virgin olive oil. The dough is obtained by mixing hard wheat flour, lard, water, extra virgin olive oil and salt.

See also
Calzone
Cuisine of Basilicata
Panzerotti

References

External links
Recipe: the Pastizz from Rotondella

Calzones
Cuisine of Basilicata
Street food in Italy